John "Jack" Walsh is an American politician who represents the 9th district of the Delaware Senate. First elected in 2016, he is a member of the Democratic Party.

References

External links
Official page at the Delaware General Assembly
Campaign website
 

Democratic Party Delaware state senators
International Brotherhood of Electrical Workers people
Living people
Year of birth missing (living people)
21st-century American politicians